Baltic 1985: Corridor To Berlin is a computer wargame published in 1984 by Strategic Simulations. Developed by Roger Keating, it is the third in the "When Superpowers Collide" series.

Gameplay
In 1985, after NATO halts a Soviet invasion of West Germany, and a communist invasion of Saudi Arabia is thwarted by the American Rapid Deployment Forces, the Soviets rush forces from the West German front into Poland to put down an anti-Soviet uprising.  NATO takes advantage of the moment by invading East Germany to relieve the siege of West Berlin and evacuate its personnel trapped behind enemy lines.

The player may choose to play either the NATO or Soviet forces, and can play in turns against another human component or against the computer.

See also
Germany 1985
RDF 1985
Norway 1985

External links
 
Images of Baltic 1985 box and manual from C64Sets.com

1984 video games
Alternate history video games
Apple II games
Cold War video games
Commodore 64 games
Computer wargames
Multiplayer and single-player video games
Strategic Simulations games
Video games developed in Australia
Video games set in Europe